The 2010–11 UAE President's Cup is the 35th season of the UAE President's Cup, the premier knockout tournament for association football clubs in the United Arab Emirates.

The format once again changed from the previous season, reverting to a knockout tournament rather than a round-robin groups phase.

The cup winner were guaranteed a place in the 2012 AFC Champions League.

Round 1 
Round 1 consisted of fourteen matches played on 20–21 September 2010. The winners of those matches advanced to Round 2, joining defending cup winners Emirates Club and UAE Pro-League winners Al Wahda.

|colspan="3" style="background-color:#B8B8B8"|20 September 2010 

|-
|colspan="3" style="background-color:#B8B8B8"|21 September 2010

|}

Round of 16 
The matches were played on 9–11 February 2011.

|colspan="3" style="background-color:#B8B8B8"|9 February 2011

|-
|colspan="3" style="background-color:#B8B8B8"|11 February 2011

|}

1 Al Ain were found to have used an ineligible player and were disqualified, Masafi went through.

Quarterfinals 
The matches will be played on 24–25 February 2011.

Semifinals

Final

Top goalscorers 
Last updated 10 February 2011

References

External links 
 UAE Presidents Cup 2010/2011 at Goalzz 

UAE President's Cup seasons
President's Cup